Nguyễn Hoàng Thiên (born 12 March 1995) is a Vietnamese tennis player.

Nguyễn has a career high ATP singles ranking of 1368 achieved on 18 June 2012. He also has a career high ATP doubles ranking of 773 achieved on 24 October 2016.

Nguyễn represents Vietnam at the Davis Cup where he has a W/L record of 13–11.

External links

1995 births
Living people
Vietnamese male tennis players
Sportspeople from Ho Chi Minh City
Tennis players at the 2010 Asian Games
Southeast Asian Games bronze medalists for Vietnam
Southeast Asian Games medalists in tennis
Competitors at the 2017 Southeast Asian Games
Asian Games competitors for Vietnam